Esra Güler (born November 22, 1994) is a Turkish women's football midfielder currently playing in the Women's TjirdFirst League for Kılıçaslan Yıldızspor with jersey number 9. She played once for the Turkey women's U-21 team.

Early life
Esra Güler was born in Antalya, Turkey on November 22, 1994. She finished Muratpaşa High School in 2011. Her father, who was a footballer playing in various teams, supported her for playing football already in her childhood, even with the boys in the neighborhood.

Career

Club

She obtained her license on February 23, 2007, for her hometown club Yeni Kapı Gençler Birliği, which played in the Turkish Women's League and was later renamed Antalyaspor. She began to participate in the league matches from the 2008–09 season on. In the 2011–12 season, the club played under the name Medical Park Antalyaspor in line with its sponsor. At the end of the 2011–12 season, the team were relegated to the Second Leaguer, and abandoned by Antalyaspor. Between 2012 and 2014, she played in the same team, which was re-founded as 1207 Antaltyaspor. With her team's Second League championship title won in the 2014–15 season, Güler enjoyed the promotion to the Women's First League again. She acted as the captain of her team.

In the 2016–17 season, Güler transferred to the Third League-team Kıçaslan Yıldızspor.

International
On November 26, 2014, Güler debuted in the Turkey women's national under-21 football team playing in the friendly match against Belgium.

Career statistics
.

Honours

Club
 Turkish Women's Second League
 1207 Antalyaspor
 Winners (1): 2014–15

Individual
 Turkish Women^s Third League
 Topscorer (17 goals) 2018–19 season with Yeni Kemer Belediyespor

References

External links

Living people
1994 births
Sportspeople from Antalya
Turkish women's footballers
Women's association football midfielders
1207 Antalya Spor players
Women's association football defenders
21st-century Turkish sportswomen